Bernhard "Berni" Schulze (born 20 May 1938) is a German sprint canoer who competed in the early 1960s. Competing in two Summer Olympics, he won a silver medal in the K-4 1000 m event at Tokyo in 1964.

References
Sport-reference.com profile

1938 births
Living people
Canoeists at the 1964 Summer Olympics
Canoeists at the 1968 Summer Olympics
German male canoeists
Olympic canoeists of the United Team of Germany
Olympic silver medalists for the United Team of Germany
Olympic medalists in canoeing
Medalists at the 1964 Summer Olympics